Congomorda atra is a species of beetle in the family Mordellidae, the only species in the genus Congomorda.

References

Mordellidae genera
Monotypic Cucujiformia genera